Taboo is a BBC television drama series produced by Scott Free London and Hardy Son & Baker. It premiered on BBC One in the United Kingdom, on 7 January 2017 and on FX in the United States, on 10 January 2017. The eight-episode series was created by Steven Knight, Tom Hardy, and his father, Chips Hardy, based on a story written by Tom and Chips Hardy.

In 1814, adventurer and businessman James Delaney (Tom Hardy) returns to England after spending twelve years in Africa, following the death of his father and the approaching end of Great Britain's war with the United States. Taboo explores the dark side of 19th-century London, its political and business corruption involving the East India Company, criminal gangs, the misery of the working class, and the increase in wealth of the rich.

Kristoffer Nyholm and Anders Engström each directed four episodes of the first series (season). Max Richter composed the score.

The series has received generally favourable reviews, with critics praising Hardy's performance, visual presentation, and pacing.

Cast

Main
 Tom Hardy as James Keziah Delaney, Horace Delaney's son
 Leo Bill as Benjamin Wilton, a records officer with the East India Company
 Jessie Buckley as Lorna Delaney (née Bow), Horace's widow
 Oona Chaplin as Zilpha Geary (née Delaney), James Delaney's half-sister
 Stephen Graham as Atticus, an underworld informant to Delaney
 Jefferson Hall as Thorne Geary, Zilpha's husband and an insurance broker
 David Hayman as Brace, Horace Delaney's loyal servant
 Edward Hogg as Michael Godfrey, minute taker with the East India Company
 Franka Potente as Helga von Hinten, a brothel madam
 Michael Kelly as Edgar Dumbarton, an American physician at St Bartholomew's Hospital and spy
 Tom Hollander as George Cholmondeley, a chemist and scientist
 Marina Hands as Countess Musgrove/Carlsbad, an American spymaster in London
 Jonathan Pryce as Sir Stuart Strange, Chairman of the East India Company
 Jason Watkins as Solomon Coop, Private Secretary to the Sovereign
 Nicholas Woodeson as Robert Thoyt, Delaney's solicitor

Recurring
 Edward Fox as Horace Delaney, the owner of a shipping company based in London
 Ruby-May Martinwood as Winter, Helga's daughter
 Scroobius Pip as French Bill, the assistant to Atticus
 Fiona Skinner as Brighton, a member of Atticus's gang.
 Mark Gatiss as Prince George, Prince Regent during the King's mental illness.
 Christopher Fairbank as Ibbotson, Delaney's tenant farmer
 Richard Dixon as Edmund Pettifer, Africa desk, East India Company
 Roger Ashton-Griffiths as Abraham Appleby, East India Company
 Danny Ligairi as Martinez, a Polynesian associate of Delaney
 Lucian Msamati as George Chichester, a Sons of Africa lawyer
 Louis Ashbourne Serkis as Robert, James Delaney's son

Production
Taboo was created by Steven Knight, Tom Hardy and his father, Edward "Chips" Hardy, and is based on a story written by Tom and Chips Hardy. Knight and Tom Hardy previously worked together in the 2013 film Locke and the TV series Peaky Blinders, which premiered in 2013. The first series was directed by Kristoffer Nyholm and Anders Engström. The music was composed by Max Richter. Steven Knight plans for two more series. Taboo was renewed for a second series in March 2017. In November 2021, Knight confirmed that six of season two's eight planned episodes had been written, and the start of filming is contingent upon Hardy's schedule. In May 2022, Knight earmarked the end of 2023 as a potential filming start date.

Episodes

Broadcast
Taboo premiered on BBC One in the United Kingdom on 7 January 2017, and on FX in the United States on 10 January 2017. The debut episode had 1.839 million viewers in the US, and a rating of 0.6 for the 18–49 demographic. Its Live+3 figures were 3.43 million viewers1.63 million adults in the category 18–49the time-shifted percentage increase of 101% in the demographic is a record for FX. In the US, the first season averaged per episode 1.33 million viewers and 0.4 rating in the 18–49 demographic on the episodes initial airings, but increased to 5.8 million viewers per episode after viewing figures from all platforms had been added, including on-air replays, delayed viewing and streaming.

Reception
The series has received generally favourable reviews, with critics praising Hardy's performance, the aesthetic and the slow burn aspect. The review aggregator Rotten Tomatoes gives the series an approval rating of 78% based on 45 reviews, with an average rating of 7.03/10. Their critical consensus reads, "After a sluggish start, Taboo takes a hold as a mysterious, dark, and often brutal period drama with plenty of promise as a seriesmost notably Tom Hardy's exceptionally watchable performance". On review aggregator Metacritic, the series has a score of 67 out of 100 based on 32 critics, indicating "generally favorable reviews".

Ben Lawrence of The Telegraph gave Taboo 3 out of 5 stars, stating that Taboos strength is that, despite borrowing from westerns, gangster flicks and even Charles Dickens, it still manages to feel utterly original. Sam Wollaston of The Guardian noted that while some of the dialogue "does make you wince", Hardy's acting and onscreen presence more than makes up for it.

Writing for The Hollywood Reporter, Tim Goodman noted that Taboo is a solid if slow, in the early going, entry in FX's stable of series, with a compelling turn by Tom Hardy. Kevin Yeoman of Screenrant wrote in his review that it all added up to a dark, slow-moving but nonetheless intriguing drama with secrets to dispense in due time. He also said that it was likely that those drawn to Hardy's onscreen intensity and seemingly unlimited capacity to become the physical embodiment of gloomy menace would be the ones most likely to stick around until the very end, and in doing so would reap the potential rewards.

Some historians have expressed concern that the East India Company may be portrayed inaccurately. Before the broadcast of Taboo, Steven Knight said, "This man, James Delaney, is a deeply flawed and deeply troubled human being. His greatest struggle will be against the East India Company which, throughout the 19th century, was the equivalent of the CIA, the NSA, and the biggest, baddest multinational corporation on earth, all rolled into one self-righteous, religiously-motivated monolith." Tirthankar Roy, an economic historian at the London School of Economics, argued that it gave an excessively negative view of the East India Company. Nick Robins, author of The Corporation That Changed the World, added that the organisation had made a positive contribution, but that by the time it was dissolved it had long "outlived its usefulness".

Awards and nominations

Home media
Season 1 was released in the United States and Canada by Echo Bridge Acquisition Corp, LLC (Echo Bridge Home Entertainment) on DVD and Blu-Ray on February 6, 2018, and in Europe by StudioCanal on May 29, 2017. The US/Canada DVD set consists of two discs while the European release is a three disc set. French and German dubbed releases were released on April 13, 2017, and May 9, 2017, respectively.

References

External links
 
 
 Taboo at FX

2010s British drama television series
2017 British television series debuts
2017 British television series endings
BBC television dramas
English-language television shows
Television series by Scott Free Productions
Television series set in the 1810s
Television shows set in London
Television series created by Steven Knight
Incest in television